The Warwick M-1 Tiny Champ is an American homebuilt aircraft that was designed by Bill Warwick
and first flown on 1 May 1960.

Design and development
The M-1 is a single engine, strut-braced, high wing, open cockpit, conventional landing gear-equipped aircraft. Doors and a rear window can be installed to create an enclosed cabin. The design won outstanding aircraft design at the Experimental Aircraft Association Airshow in 1960.

Specifications (M-1 Tiny Champ)

References

External links
Image of the W-1

Homebuilt aircraft